Ceratocombidae is a family of litter bugs in the order Hemiptera. They are closely related to the Dipsocoridae. There are at least 3 genera and 20 described species in Ceratocombidae. The forewing has 2 to 3 large cells and body does not have any strong bristles and there is no central eye bristle. Their diversity is greatest in the Indo-Pacific region.

Genera
Three genera are placed in this family:
 Astemma 
 Ceratocombus 
 Leptonannus

References

Further reading

 
 

 
Dipsocoromorpha
Heteroptera families
Articles created by Qbugbot